Eshkaft-e Siahoo, that translates to "Black Cave" from the regional dialect, was used by Neolithic humans as a rock shelter between 12,000 and 10,000-years ago. It is located near Rahmat Mountain on the Marvdasht Plain in the Fars province, Iran. The cave was discovered in June 2006 and archaeological excavations were subsequently undertaken, led by Iranian archeologist Mohammad Feizkhah.

References

Archaeological sites in Iran
Former populated places in Iran
Buildings and structures in Fars Province